Gyala Peri (Chinese: 加拉白垒, Pinyin: Jiālābáilěi) is a  peak just beyond the eastern end of the Himalayas at the entrance to Tsangpo gorge. It is part of Nyenchen Tanglha Shan, although it is sometimes included in Namcha Barwa Himal of the Himalayas.

Gyala Peri lies just north of the Great Bend of the Yarlung Tsangpo River, the main river of southeastern Tibet, which becomes the Brahmaputra in India. It is  NNW of the higher Namcha Barwa.

Notable features
Gyala Peri has great vertical relief above the Tsangpo gorge and is the highest peak of the Nyenchen Tanglha Shan.

Climbing history
The first ascent of Gyala Peri was in 1986, by a Japanese expedition, via the South Ridge.
The group spent about 1 months on the mountain. The U.K. Alpine Club's Himalayan Index lists no other ascents.

Gallery

See also 
 Geology of the Himalaya

Footnotes

Other sources

External links 
 Gyala Peri Virtual Aerial Video 

Mountains of Tibet
Seven-thousanders of the Transhimalayas